This is a list of the first minority male lawyer(s) and judge(s) in Hawaii. It includes the year in which the men were admitted to practice law (in parentheses). Also included are other distinctions such as the first minority men in their state to graduate from law school or become a political figure.

Firsts in Hawaii's history

Lawyers 

First male of Japanese descent: Keigoro Katsura (c. 1855) 
First African American male: Thomas McCants Stewart (1875) 
First Native Hawaiian male: Joseph Nāwahī (c. 1888) 
First Chinese American male to practice before the Supreme Court of Hawaii: Anthony Yuen Seto (1916)
First Filipino male: Pablo Manlapit (1919)

State judges 

 First male of Native Hawaiian descent (Chief Justice; Supreme Court of Hawaii): Kamehameha III in 1840 
 First African American male: William F. Crockett during the 1900s 
 First Chinese American male (circuit court): William "Billy" Heen in 1917 
First Asian American male (magistrate): Tomekichi Okino in 1931
First Asian American male (Japanese descent) (First Circuit Court): Robert K. Murakami in 1953
First Japanese American male (Supreme Court of Hawaii): Masaji Marumoto 1956-1960—Territory of Hawaii; 1967-1973)
First Japanese American male (Chief Justice; Supreme Court of Hawaii): Wilfred Tsukiyama (c. 1924) in 1959 
 First Filipino American male (circuit court): Ben Menor in 1968 
 First Filipino American male (Supreme Court of Hawaii): Ben Menor in 1974 
 First Samoan American male (family court): Bode Uale in 1991
 First Korean American male (Chief Justice; Supreme Court of Hawaii): Ronald Moon in 1993

Federal judges 
First Chinese American male (United States Court of Appeals for the First Circuit): Chuck Mau in 1950  
First Japanese American male (U.S. Court of Claims): Shiro Kashiwa (1936) in 1972:

 First Asian American male (U.S. District Court for the District of Hawaii): Dick Yin Wong (1950) in 1975

First Japanese American male (U.S. Court of Appeals for the Federal Circuit): Shiro Kashiwa (1936) in 1982

Attorney General of Hawaii 

First Asian American male (Territory of Hawaii): Michiro Watanabe in 1952
First Japanese American male (after statehood): Shiro Kashiwa (1936):

Deputy Attorney General 

 First Chinese American male: Chuck Mau circa 1936

United States Attorney 

 First Japanese American male: Yoshimi Hayashi in 1967

Deputy Public Prosecutor 

 First Asian American male: Ralph T. Yamaguchi in 1937

Political Office 

First male of Native Hawaiian descent (Governor of Hawaii): John D. Waiheʻe III (1976) from 1986-1994

Hawaii State Bar Association 

 First Chinese male admitted to bar: Hong Yen Chang (1889) 
First Japanese American male to pass the bar exam: Arthur K. Ozawa (1910)
First Filipino males admitted to bar: Peter Aduja and Ben Menor (1953) 
 First Japanese American male (president): Masaji Marumoto in 1954

Firsts in local history 
 Masaji Marumoto: First Japanese American male to serve as the Honolulu City and County Attorney (1933)
 Ralph T. Yamaguchi: First Asian American male to serve as a deputy public prosecutor for the Honolulu district

See also 

 List of first minority male lawyers and judges in the United States

Other topics of interest 

 List of first women lawyers and judges in the United States
 List of first women lawyers and judges in Hawaii

References 

 
Minority, Hawaii, first
Minority, Hawaii, first
minority male lawyers and judges
Hawaii lawyers
law